Lady Pink, born Sandra Fabara (1964), is an Ecuadorian-American graffiti and mural artist.

Early life
Fabara was born in Ambato, Ecuador in 1964 and moved to the Astoria neighborhood of Queens, New York when she was seven years old. She grew up wanting to be an architect like her father. She started her graffiti writing career in 1979 following the loss of a boyfriend.  She exorcised her grief by tagging her boyfriend's name across New York City. Lady Pink studied at the Manhattan High School of Art and Design, where she was introduced to graffiti. During her senior year of school, she began to start exhibiting her work while balancing her personal life.

Career 

She has focused her career on using graffiti and murals as acts of rebellion and self-expression, and empowering women. As Lady Pink says, "It's not just a boys club. We have a sisterhood thing going." She was nicknamed the "first lady of graffiti," because she was one of the first women active in the early 1980s New York City subway graffiti subculture.

In 1980, she created the all-female graffiti crew Ladies of the Arts. Within a few years, Lady Pink began running with the graffiti crews TC5 (The Cool 5) and TPA (The Public Animals). From 1979 to 1985, Lady Pink painted New York City Subway trains. She took a short hiatus in 1987 from painting outdoors. Then from 1993 to 1997 she worked on freight trains with her husband, SMITH (Roger Smith, formerly of the graffiti duo Sane Smith). 

In 1980, she was included in the landmark New York show "GAS: Graffiti Art Success" at Fashion Moda, which traveled in a modified form downtown to The New Museum of Contemporary Art.

Name origin 
Lady Pink was first given her name “Pink” by Seen TC5. The name was chosen for aesthetics because the name Pink is feminine and because she wanted other writers to know that she was a girl. Lady Pink also said that the letters appealed to her; the way the "L" kicked out and how the "I" was cute and could be dotted with a heart. She started calling herself Lady Pink because of her love of historical romances, England, the Victorian period, and the aristocracy. She titled herself like royalty. She never wanted to tag her full name because she did not want to be associated with the Pink Lady, a woman in the club scene who sold pink cocaine.

Early career 
Her career as an artist started to take off after the 1980s, following the Graffiti Art Success for America show which invited graffiti artists to paint on the walls of the gallery. In 1983, she played the leading role in the film Wild Style, and was involved with a book entitled Subway Art by Martha Cooper and Henry Chalfant. During this time, she collaborated with Jenny Holzer several times for an exhibition at Fashion MODA. Her first solo show, "Femmes-Fatales," was in 1984, when she was 21, at the Moore College of Art & Design in Philadelphia.

Later career 

Lady Pink's studio paintings often use themes of New York City Subway trains and POP-surrealist cityscapes. Some of her pieces are in the collections of the Whitney Museum of American Art, the Metropolitan Museum of Art, and the Brooklyn Museum in New York City, as well as the Groningen Museum in the Netherlands. 

Lady Pink is now visits schools to teach students about the power of art and how it can serve as a medium for self-expression and community engagement. Each year she does a mural project with the students of Frank Sinatra School of the Arts in Astoria, Queens.

Her mural, Pink (2007) work was one of the many murals destroyed at 5Pointz in Queens, however in February 2018 the Brooklyn Supreme Court awarded each of the 45 artists for their destroyed work. She was connected to her art and although the former owner of the building painted over the walls, she said she could still see the ghost of her mural.

Selected works

Paintings 

The Black Dude (1983) - spray enamel on canvas, in private collection.
China, One Child Only (1992) - spray enamel on canvas, in a private collection.
Brick Lady in Spray (1993) - spray enamel on canvas, in a private collection.
Queen Matilda (2007) - acrylic on canvas, in private collection.
Urban Decay (2008) - acrylic on canvas, in private collection.

Murals 

Brick Woman - located in Braddock, Pennsylvania.
9/11 Tribute (2001) - Painted one month after September 11 as a tribute to the heroes involved, located in Queens, New York.
Pink (2007) - was located at 5Pointz, no longer exists.
Lady Liberty (2016) - located in Queens, New York.

Trains 

John Lennon (1981) - The first half of the Subway train painted by Lady Pink and Iz the Wiz as a tribute for John Lennon.
The Beatles (1981) - The second half of the Subway train painted by Lady Pink and Iz the Wiz as a tribute for The Beatles.
Welcome to Heaven (1982) - A tribute for Caine1, a graffiti artist who was killed by a neighbor that mistook him for a burglar.

Personal life 
She is married to another graffiti artist, SMITH (Roger Smith, formerly of the graffiti duo Sane Smith), with whom she often collaborates on murals and commercial work. She is bisexual.

References

External links
Lady Pink website (current)
Lady Pink website (archived)
 Lady Pink's Smithsonian artist file
 The Lady Pink collection at the Brooklyn Museum
 "Lady Pink and the Evolution of Street Art" from the NEA Arts Magazine (2013)
 'Graffiti' Glitters at the Brooklyn Museum on All Things Considered, NPR (2006)
 Lady Pink in the collection of The Museum of Modern Art
 "this is Not a Game" Interview with Lady Pink by Nijla Mu'min (2019)
"Lady Pink Was Here" Chicago Tribune (1993)

1964 births
Ecuadorian emigrants to the United States
Living people
Modern artists
American graffiti artists
American women painters
Women graffiti artists
Women muralists
Artists from New York City
High School of Art and Design alumni
21st-century American women artists
American LGBT artists
Bisexual artists